The Coan River is a  river in Virginia's Northern Neck region. It is a tributary of the Potomac River. It flows from its source in Heathsville through Northumberland County and into the Potomac between Lewisetta and Walnut Point.

See also
List of rivers of Virginia

References

Rivers of Northumberland County, Virginia
Rivers of Virginia
Tributaries of the Potomac River